The 1995–1996 season was the 117th season in Bolton Wanderers F.C.'s existence, and their first ever season in the Premier League following promotion from the Football League First Division.

This article covers the period from 1 July 1995 to 30 June 1996.

Season summary
Bolton Wanderers returned to the top flight after a 15-year exile, only eight years after playing in the old Fourth Division, but with a new manager in Roy McFarland following Bruce Rioch's move to Arsenal. Bolton made a terrible start to the campaign and McFarland made several moves in the transfer market, but this was not enough to turn things around and he was sacked on New Year's Day with Bolton bottom of the table and just two wins to their name. His assistant Colin Todd took over, and Bolton's form improved, but they could not stave off relegation. In spite of this, their form under Todd was so improved that, had the results from under Todd's management been shown all season, Bolton would have stayed up in 14th place.

Squad
Squad at end of season

Left club during season

Results

Premier League

F.A. Cup

Coca-Cola Cup

Top scorers

References

Bolton Wanderers F.C. seasons
Bolton Wanderers